Dmitry Sergeyevich Sergeyev (born 3 April 2000) is a Russian professional footballer who plays for Kairat.

Club career
Sergeyev made his professional debut for Zenit-2 Saint Petersburg in the FNL on 4 August 2018 in a game vs Tom Tomsk.

On 23 June 2021, Sergeyev joined FC Baltika Kaliningrad on loan.

Sergeyev made his debut in the Russian Premier League for FC Zenit Saint Petersburg on 21 May 2022 in a game against FC Nizhny Novgorod.

On 28 February 2023, Kazakhstan Premier League club Kairat announced the signing of Sergeyev to a two-year contract, with the option of a third.

Career statistics

External links

References

2000 births
Living people
Russian footballers
Association football midfielders
Association football defenders
FC Zenit-2 Saint Petersburg players
FC Baltika Kaliningrad players
FC Zenit Saint Petersburg players
Russian First League players
Russian Second League players
Russian Premier League players